Gramme-Aue is a former Verwaltungsgemeinschaft ("collective municipality") in the district of Sömmerda, in Thuringia, Germany. The seat of the Verwaltungsgemeinschaft was in Großrudestedt. On 31 December 2019 it merged into the new Verwaltungsgemeinschaft Gramme-Vippach.

The Verwaltungsgemeinschaft Gramme-Aue consisted of the following municipalities:
Alperstedt 
Großmölsen 
Großrudestedt
Kleinmölsen 
Nöda 
Ollendorf 
Udestedt

Former Verwaltungsgemeinschaften in Thuringia